Schlosshotel Orth   is an Austrian television series.

See also
List of Austrian television series

External links
 

Austrian television series
1990s Austrian television series
2000s Austrian television series
1996 Austrian television series debuts
2004 Austrian television series endings
German-language television shows
ORF (broadcaster)